The Government of United Republic of Tanzania has enacted four Acts concerning the control of freedom and regulation of media in the country. These are The Cybercrimes Act, 2015, The Statistics Act, 2013,  The Media Services Act, 2015 and The Access to Information Act, 2015.  The Government of the Republic of Tanzania on one side claims that the four Acts were highly needed to facilitate access to information and control the media sector. On the other, political analysts, activists and everyday people have criticized the Acts, predicting that they will negatively affect freedom of the media and, eventually, citizens' freedom of speech. The Acts give Tanzania's Minister responsible for information the power to ban any media which may seems to report, publish, print or broadcast information contrary to the code of conducts or threaten peace in the state.

Brief history 
The Media Services Act, 2016, was enacted in 2016 by the parliament of the united republic of Tanzania on 5 November 2016 and signed by President John Pombe Magufuli two weeks later. The Act replaced the then restrictive newspaper Act of 1976. The expectation of many people was that the Act would become an updated media law adhering to international conventions like the United Nation's Universal Declaration of Human Rights (UNDHR), the East African Community  Treaty and other sources which affect then liberty of citizens to access information. Instead, the Acts appears to many to act to deprive certain civil constitutional rights, including freedom of expression and freedom of access to information.

Reaction from the press 
The Media Council of Tanzania (MCT), Legal and Human Right Centre (LHRC), and Tanzania Human Rights Defenders Coalition (THRDC) on 11 January 2017 filed a petition at the East African Court of Justice (EACJ) challenging the newly passed Media Service Act, 2016. The petition, supported by a team of lawyers from MCT, LHRC and THRDC claims that the Act deprives civil liberties and access to information rights guaranteed under Article 18, subsections (a), (b), (c) and (d) of the Constitution of Tanzania, respectively addressing:
 freedom of opinion and to speech
 the right to seek, receive and/or disseminate information, regardless of national boundaries;
 the freedom to communicate and protection from interference
 the right to be informed at all times of various important events of life and activities of the people and also of issues of importance to the society.

References 

Law of Tanzania